Fahmi Ben Romdhane (born 12 December 1990) is a Tunisian football midfielder and later defender who currently plays for ES Tunis.

Career
Ben Romhane joined ES Tunis in the 2017–18 season.

Honours
ES Tunis
 Tunisian Super Cup: 2020–21

References

1990 births
Living people
Tunisian footballers
US Monastir (football) players
EGS Gafsa players
ES Hammam-Sousse players
CS Hammam-Lif players
CS Sfaxien players
AS Marsa players
Association football midfielders
Tunisian Ligue Professionnelle 1 players